Karl Eberhard Schöngarth (22 April 1903 – 16 May 1946) was a German SS officer during the Nazi era. He was a war criminal who perpetrated mass murder and genocide in German-occupied Poland during the Holocaust; he participated in the January 1942 Wannsee Conference, at which the genocidal Final Solution to the Jewish Question was originally planned  After the war, Schöngarth and six others were tried for murdering a single downed Allied pilot, Americo S. Galle, in 1944. They were all found guilty. Five of them, including Schöngarth, were sentenced to death. They were all executed in 1946.

Early life 
Karl Georg Schöngarth was born on 22 April 1903 in Leipzig, Germany. His father was a master brewer. Schöngarth began high school at the age of 11, but soon dropped out in order to work at a garden center to support the war effort. On 7 March 1918 Schöngarth was awarded a “Young Men's Iron Medal”. After the war, he was to go back to high school to complete his education, but instead joined a Freikorps paramilitary group in Thuringia. This eventually led to Schöngarth joining a local Nazi group in Erfurt on November 1923, as he felt the organization agreed with his ethno-nationalistic tendencies. Schöngarth fled to Coburg to try to escape from his crime of treason, but eventually came back to Erfurt and was given amnesty. In 1924 Schöngarth finished his high school education and got a job at the Deutsche bank while also joining the Army Infantry Regiment 1/15 in Gießen.

Karl Eberhard Schöngarth later joined the SA (Sturmabteilung) as member number 43,870 while claiming expulsion from the army. By 1924, Schöngarth's involvement with the Nazi Party had decreased, and he enrolled at the University of Leipzig, majoring in economics and law. He completed his first bar exam in 1928 and landed a job in the Naumburg Superior Courts. He then went on to acquire his doctorate in law from the Institute for Labor and Law, on 28 June 1929 at the age of 26, and was awarded a Cum Laude. His thesis was on the subject of "the refusal of notices of termination of employment contracts". He then decided to take his second bar exam in December 1933 and became a court official for Magdeburg, Erfurt and Torgau. Eberhard married Dorothea Gross, with whom he had two sons.

SS career 
After becoming a court official, Schöngarth began involving himself more heavily in the Nazi Party. On 1 February 1933 he joined the SS (member No°. 67,174 and Nazi  N°. 2,848,857). Because party membership was now crucial for getting a government job in Germany, his involvement allowed him to become a postmaster in Erfurt. In 1933 he became a member of the SD, the SS's own intelligence service.  He eventually left his postmaster position on 1 November 1935, and joined the Gestapo. During his time working with the Gestapo, he worked in the main press office, the political-church council, and the Arnsberg district office in Dortmund, he also served as police chief in Münster and was named a government counselor. Though unknown why he found employment at the political church, a letter from Reinhard Heydrich to the Reich Ministry of the Interior recommended Eberhard become a part of the Secret State Police due to his broad and insightful law background. He was placed with the Gestapo, and later with the SS.  He also rose in ranks in the SS, becoming a first lieutenant, captain, major and lieutenant colonel in 1939, and from colonel to brigadier general in 1940.

War crimes
During the German attack on Poland he was promoted to SS Obersturmbannführer. He later served as a Senior Inspector for the Reich Security Main Office in Dresden.

In January 1941 he was sent to Kraków, occupied Poland, as senior commander of the SiPo and SD. During the time Schöngarth was stationed in Kraków, he led a temporary Einsatzgruppe unit, Einsatzgruppe z.b.V.. In June 1941, Schöngarth, on the orders of the RSHA, deployed Wolfgang Birkner to the Bialystok District to suppress resistance. Schöngarth was responsible for the murders of approximately 10,000 Polish Jews between July and September 1941 and the massacre of Lwów professors and their families behind the frontlines of Operation Barbarossa in the Soviet Union. Schöngarth attended the Wannsee Conference on 20 January 1942, along with Dr. Rudolf Lange (Einsatzgruppe A), who had also participated in the Holocaust. From early July 1944 until the end of war he was the head of the BdS in the Netherlands. After the ambushing of SS General Hanns Albin Rauter on 6 March 1945, Schongarth ordered mass executions in reprisal. A total of 263 people were executed, including 117 political prisoners at the location of the attack, 50 prisoners in Kamp Amersfoort, and 40 prisoners each in the Hague and Rotterdam.

In 2019, a mass grave containing the remains of more than 1,000 Jews was discovered during renovation work on houses in Brest. An Einsatzgruppe led by Schöngarth murdered more than 5,000 Jews from the Brześć Ghetto between 10 and 12 July 1941.

Trial and execution
Schöngarth was captured by the Allies at the end of the war in Europe. After an investigation, British occupation authorities charged him with the murder of Americo S. Galle, an American pilot. The charge came after several Dutch people came forward and told British investigators that they had seen Galle's plane being shot down. Galle had been captured alive, but was later escorted into the woods, after which the witnesses said they heard a gunshot.

On 21 November 1944, Galle's plane had been shot down in Enschede. He was captured by German soldiers, taken to a villa which the SD was using in Enschede, and had his army clothes changed out for civilian clothes. Schöngarth issued an order to kill Galle.

Several hours later, a car was driven to the area. Erwin Knop (born 16 August 1905), the commander of the local SiPo and the head of a local Einsatzkommando in Enschede, emerged. He was accompanied by Untersturmführer Wilhelm Hadler (born 14 February 1898) and Unterscharführer Herbert Gernoth (born 12 January 1906), both of whom were subordinates to Knop.

Knop took Galle into the car. He was followed by Scharführer Erich Lebing, 56, and Waffen-SS Oberscharführer Fritz Boehm, 28, both of whom were attached to the local SD. Obersturmführer Friederich Beeck (born 5 August 1886), the head of the Enschede villa, supervised the execution, choosing a burial site and ordering a grave to be dug. Lebing drove the car into the woods and kept watch as the others prepared to carry out the execution. Knop told Galle in English what was happening, to which the airman responded by being "very downhearted." Hadler and Gernoth dug a shallow grave, after which the rest of the group arrived. Hadler and Gernoth then escorted Galle from the car to the grave, where Gernoth shot him in the back of the neck.

Schöngarth, Beeck, Knop, Gernoth, Hadler, Knop, Lebing, and Boehm were tried by a British military court in Burgsteinfurt in February 1946. At the time, neither Galle's identity nor his nationality were known, so the defendants were charged with murdering an "unknown Allied airman." During his trial, Schöngarth's crimes in Poland were never mentioned, while his crimes in the Netherlands were only briefly discussed.

 "During your period in Holland, how many executions in all did you have to order or sanction?"
 "At the time of that interrogation I thought it would be about 150 to 200 cases, but they were all executions after proper sentences; they were only civilians who were sentenced to death on account of their disturbing order; and that was an order from the Reichskommissar."

Schöngarth denied any involvement in Galle's death. However, all of Schöngarth's codefendants said they had been following his orders. The lawyer for the Schöngarth's codefendants accused him of trying to force the blame onto his men.

 "I put it to you that the real truth of what happened on the 21st November is this: a British or American airman landed in the grounds of the Villa and was captured by your men. You yourself decided that he was to be shot. You yourself ordered Knop to have him shot. You then went away in your car leaving your men to take the responsibility, and now that they stand in peril you, their commander, are trying to save your life at their expense."
 "No."

On 11 February 1946, all of the defendants were found guilty. The defense of superior orders was rejected, with five of those convicted being sentenced to death, including Schöngarth. Lebing and Boehm avoided death sentences after using different defenses. Lebing claimed he hadn't realized that Galle was a POW until it was too late since he was wearing civilian clothing. Boehm claimed ignorance and disgust over the execution, and said he'd tried to stop it from happening. Lebing was sentenced to 15 years in prison and Boehm was sentenced to 10 years in prison. After the trial was over, two Dutchmen found Galle's notebook, which showed that he was an American.

Schöngarth and all of his condemned accomplices were executed by Albert Pierrepoint on 16 May 1946 at Hamelin Prison. Also hanged on the same day for unrelated crimes at Hamelin were Bruno Tesch and Karl Weinbacher.

While awaiting execution, Schöngarth was interviewed by a Dutch investigator. He was asked about suspected war criminal Pieter Menten and atrocities in which he was suspected of involvement. At the end of the interview, the investigator asked Schöngarth if he was telling the truth, he replied "You know, I have only three weeks to live. That's the whole truth." Shortly before his execution, Schöngarth was visited by Menten; the two turned out to be close friends. Schöngarth told Menten he had done him many favours in the past and had him promise to look out for his family, after which he gave him legal advice.

Notes and references

External links
 
 Holocaust Research Project: Karl Eberhard Schöngarth 

1903 births
1946 deaths
Military personnel from Leipzig
People from the Kingdom of Saxony
Einsatzgruppen personnel
Holocaust perpetrators in Poland
Holocaust perpetrators in the Netherlands
Gestapo personnel
SS and Police Leaders
Waffen-SS personnel
SS-Brigadeführer
Kapp Putsch participants
20th-century Freikorps personnel
Nazis executed by the British military by hanging
Executed mass murderers